Lysimachia quadriflora, the fourflower yellow loosestrife, is a species of herbaceous plant in the family Primulaceae. It native to the eastern United States and Canada.

Description
It grows in moist to wet conditions in calcareous soils. The leaves are linear, firm, with mostly smooth edges. The flowers grow from an inflorescence cluster at the ends of the stems and branches. The five-parted flower is yellow with a reddish center and blooms from July to August. Its habitats include wet meadows, prairies, fields, swamps, and marshes.

References

External links

quadriflora
Flora of Eastern Canada
Flora of the Eastern United States
Flora of the Great Lakes region (North America)
Plants described in 1803